Nayef R. F. Al-Rodhan (born 1959) is a Saudi philosopher, neuroscientist, geostrategist, and author. He is an honorary fellow of St. Antony’s College at Oxford University, Oxford, United Kingdom, and senior fellow and head of the Geneva Centre for Security Policy’s Geopolitics and Global Futures Programme, Switzerland, Senior Research Fellow, Institute of Philosophy, School of Advanced Study, University of London, United Kingdom, and Member of the Global Future Council on Frontier Risks at the World Economic Forum. His research focuses on the interplay between: Analytic Neurophilosophy, Geopolitics, Global Futures, Outer space security, Cultural discourse and synergies, Disruptive technologies, International Relations and Policy.

Biography
Professor Nayef Al-Rodhan began his career as a neurosurgeon and neuroscientist. As a medical student at Newcastle University, he was mentored and influenced by the renowned neurologist, Lord Walton. He trained in neurosurgery and conducted neuroscience research at the Mayo Clinic, Rochester, Minnesota in the United States. He became Chief Resident in neurosurgery and was influenced by Thoralf M. Sundt, David Piepgrass, and Patrick J Kelly at the Mayo Clinic. He obtained a Ph.D. in 1988 for his work on the Characterization of Opioid and Neurotensin Receptor Subtypes in the Brain with Respect to Antinociception.

In 1993, on a fellowship from the Congress of Neurological Surgeons, he joined the department of neurosurgery at the Yale University School of Medicine as a fellow in epilepsy surgery and molecular neuroscience under the direction of Dennis Spencer.

In 1994, Nayef Al-Rodhan became a fellow at the department of neurosurgery at the Massachusetts General Hospital at Harvard Medical School, where he worked on the study of neuropeptides, molecular genetics, and neuronal regeneration. In 1995, he was appointed to the faculty of the Harvard Medical School and while at Harvard and Massachusetts General Hospital, he founded the neurotechnology program with James E. Muller, co-founder of IPPNW . Working with Robert Martuza, Al-Rodhan also founded the Laboratories for Cellular Neurosurgery and Neurosurgical Technology at the department of neurosurgery of Massachusetts General Hospital, Harvard Medical School.

Neuroscience awards
Nayef Al-Rodhan has received the following research awards: Sir James Spence Prize, the Gibb Prize, the Farquhar-Murray Prize, the American Association of Neurological Surgeon Prize (twice), the Meninger Prize, the Annual Resident Prize of the Congress of Neurological Surgeons, the Young Investigator Prize of the American Association of Neurological Surgeons, and the Annual Fellowship Prize of the Congress of Neurological Surgeons.

Neuroscience and international relations
Since 2002, Nayef Al-Rodhan has shifted his scholarly focus to the interplay between neuroscience and international relations. Through several publications, he has pioneered the application of neuroscience and the neuro-behavioural consequences of the neurochemical and cellular mechanisms that underpin emotions, amorality, egoisms, fear, greed, and dominance, into the analysis and conceptualization of trends in contemporary geopolitics, global security, national security, transcultural security, and war and peace.

In 2006, Nayef Al-Rodhan joined the Geneva Center for Security Policy in Geneva, Switzerland, as a senior scholar in geostrategy and director of the Geopolitics and Global Futures Programme.
In 2009, Al-Rodhan became a senior member of St. Antony’s College, Oxford University, where he analyses, amongst other things, critical turning points in the Arab-Islamic world and their current and future regional and global geopolitical relevance. In 2014, he became an honorary fellow of St. Antony's College. His current geostrategy interests include: Geopolitics of the Middle East; sustainable national and global security; geopolitics of outer space and strategic technologies; and global strategic   cascading risks.
His philosophical interests include:global justice; human dignity and international order; shared history of humanity and transcultural security and synergy; philosophy of sustainable history and the dignity of man; history of ideas; neurophilosophy of human nature and its implications for war, peace and moral and political cooperation between ideologies, states and cultures.

See also
 Nayef Al-Rodhan Prize

References

External links

Nayef Al-Rodhan's personal webpage

1959 births
Living people
Yale School of Medicine
21st-century philosophers
Saudi Arabian neuroscientists
Alumni of Newcastle University
Saudi Arabian neurosurgeons
Massachusetts General Hospital fellows
International relations scholars
Saudi Arabian political scientists
Political realists
Harvard Medical School faculty
Geopoliticians
Futurologists
Philosophers of history
Bioethicists
Analytic philosophers
Historians of the Middle East